Diego Snepvangers (born 3 June 1998) is a Dutch footballer who plays as a winger for Kozakken Boys.

Club career
Snepvangers made his professional debut in the Eerste Divisie for NAC Breda on 25 November 2016 in a game against SC Cambuur. In his second season for NAC, he played in the Eredivisie. In 2018, NAC loaned Snepvangers out to Helmond Sport. His two years at Helmond in the Eerste Divisie were highly productive: 52 caps in regular league games and 7 goals.

In 2020, he moved on to SV Spakenburg in the Tweede Divisie. On 5 May 2021, Snepvangers signed with ASWH. At ASWH he played very little, due to an injury. In May 2022, he signed with Kozakken Boys.

References

External links
 

1998 births
Sportspeople from Bergen op Zoom
Living people
Dutch footballers
NAC Breda players
Helmond Sport players
SV Spakenburg players
ASWH players
Kozakken Boys players
Eredivisie players
Eerste Divisie players
Tweede Divisie players
Association football wingers
Footballers from North Brabant